Girl Next is a 2021 American horror film directed by Larry Wade Carrell and written by Zeph E. Daniel. It stars Lacey Cofran as Lorian West, a woman who is abducted, drugged, and taken to a secluded Texas ranch where young women are tortured and brainwashed into becoming obedient, living sex dolls that are then sold into the sex trade. Alongside Cofran, the film's cast includes Marcus Jean Pirae, Paula Marcenaro Solinger, and Rachel Alig.

Girl Next was released on June 18, 2021.

Cast
 Lacey Cofran as Lorian West
 Marcus Jean Pirae as Heinrich
 Paula Marcenaro Solinger
 Rachel Alig

Release
In December 2019, Dread Central and Rue Morgue reported that Girl Next was eyeing a May 2020 release. The film was released by Gravitas Ventures on June 18, 2021.

Awards won

2021 
 13 Horror Film and Screenplay Contest: Best Film - Girl Next
 Multi Dimension Independent Film Festival: Best Indie Feature - Girl Next, Directed by Larry Wade Carrell
 Shock Fest: Golden Stake Award - Girl Next, Directed by Larry Wade Carrell
 13 Horror Film and Screenplay Contest: Best Film - Girl Next
 Accolade Competition: Feature Film - Larry Wade Carrell.
 Anatolia International Film Festival (2021) Best Drama/Thriller/Horror Feature Film - Larry Wade Carrell, Crazed House. Best Original Score - Colin McGinness, Crazed House.
 Boston Independent Film Awards: Best Narrative Feature Best Horror - Girl Next, Director: Larry Wade Carrell. Best Actress - Lacey Cofran for Girl Next. Best Editor - Girl Next Editor: Larry Wade Carrell. Best Trailer - Girl Next.
 European Cinematography Awards (ECA) (Oct, 2021): Best Feature Film Cinematography - Pau Mirabet, Crazed House
 Fright Night International Horror Film Festival (2021): Best Actress In A Feature Film -  Paula Marcenaro Solinger. Best Actor In A Feature Film  -  Marcus Jean Pirae. Best Ensemble Cast In A Feature Film  -  Girl Next. Best Fright Night Horror Feature Film  -  Girl Next.
 Horror Bowl Movie Award:Best Direction - Larry Wade Carrell, Crazed House.
 Hot Springs International Horror Film Festival (2021) Best Horror Feature - Larry Wade Carrell.
 Iconic Images Film Festival: Best Visual Elements - Larry Wade Carrell, Prodigy Digital Media, Barcelona, Frameworksvfx, Greece and gForce Animation in Houston for Crazed House LTD. Iconic Poster Design - Larry Wade Carrell.
 Idaho Horror Film Festival: Best Feature Film - Larry Wade Carrell, Crazed House.
 Las Vegas Independent Film Festival: Best Actor - Marcus Jean Pirae, Crazed House
 LasVegas International Film Festival: Best Actor Marcus Jean Pirae.
 MLC Awards: Best Psycho Vibe Production - GIRL NEXT. Written By Zeph E. Daniel and Directed by Larry Wade Carrell.  Best Actress in a Lead Role - Paula Marcenaro Solinger.  Best Actor in a leading role - Marcus Jean Pirae for Girl Next.  Best Production Editing - Girl Next / Patricia Bursiel Keith Daniel (Dir. Larry Wade Carrell.  2 special WILD CARD AWARDS, Strong Filmmaking Talent - Larry Wade Carrell for Girl Next.  Outstanding SPFX Work - Kristi Boul - Rancid House, gForce Animation - Slade Deliberto and Proddigi Digital Media - Jos Man.
 Macabre Faire Film Festival: Best Supporting Actress, Feature Film - Paula Marcenaro Solinger. Best Editing, Feature Film - Larry Wade Carrell, Crazed House. Best Costumes, Feature Film - Summer Moore. Best SPFX, Feature Film - Kristi Soul, Crazed House
 Matrix Film Festival: Best Producer - Loris Curci, Zeph E Daniel, Patricia Bursiel Keith Daniel
 Medusa Film Festival: Best Feature - Larry Carrell. Best Actress - Lacey Cofran. Best Actor - Marcus Jean Pirae. Best Male Director - Larry Carrell.
 Milan Gold Awards: Gold Award Screenplay - Zeph E. Daniel.  Gold Award Editing - Larry W. Carrell.  Silver Award Feature Film - Girl Next.  Silver Award Director - Larry W. Carrell.  Silver Award Producer - Loris Curci.  Silver Award Actress - Paula Marcenaro Solinger.
 Multi Dimensional Independent Film Festival: Best Indie Feature - Girl Next, Directed by Larry Wade Carrell
 New York Neorealism Film Awards: Best Cinematography - Pau Mirabet, Crazed House
 Paradise Film Festival: Best Director - Larry Wade Carrell, Crazed House
 Prague Film Festival: Best Horror Film, Girl Next - Larry Wade Carrell
 Red Dragon Creative Awards:  Best Direction - Larry Carrell.  Best Actor - Marcus Jean Pirae.  Best Thriller Feature - Girl Next.  Best Horror Feature - Girl Next.  Best Feature Of The Fest - Girl Next.
 Rock Horror Film Festival, Rio De Janeiro, Brazil: Best Sinister Feature - Larry Wade Carrell Crazed House LTD.
 Shock Fest: Golden Stake Award - Girl Next, Directed by Larry Wade Carrell
 SoCal Film Awards: Best Feature Film, Diamond Award - Larry Wade Carrell, Crazed House
 Southern California International Film Festival: Best Horror Feature - Girl Next. Best Cinematography - Girl Next.
 Southern California International Film Festival: Best Horror Feature Film - Girl Next. Best Cinematography - Girl Next

2022 
 Actress Universe 2022: Best Actress (1st place), Best Actress in a Horror - Paula Marcenaro Solinger
 Beachfront Film Festival: Best Horror Feature - Girl Next.
 Beyond the Curve International Film Festival (BCIFF): Best Narrative Feature - Larry Wade Carrell. Best Cinematographer - Larry Wade Carrell. Best Actor - Marcus Jean Pirae
 First Glance Film Festival Los Angeles: Breakout Performance - Lacey Cofran, Girl Next.
 Horror Film Awards: Best Feature Horror - Girl Next.  Best Director - Larry Wade Carrell, Girl Next
 Indo-Global International Film Festival: Best Director of the Year Award, Larry Carrell - Girl Next.
 LACA Awards: Best Feature Film Cinematography, Pau Mirabet - Girl Next.
 Rocky Mountain International Film Festival: Best Horror Feature.
 Stanley Film Awards: Best Feature Film - Girl Next Larry, Wade Carrell.
 White Vulture Film Festival: Best US Feature, Girl Next. Best Director, Larry Carrell. Best Supporting Actress, Rachel Alig. Best Special FX, Girl Next.

Reviews

 Nerdly Uk: https://www.nerdly.co.uk/category/reviews/movies/
 Film Threat: https://filmthreat.com/reviews/girl-next/
 Scéne Ma BCIFF TEAM: https://www.bciff.org/review-girl-next/
 Morbidly Beautiful: https://morbidlybeautiful.com/terror-tuesdays-girl-next/

References

External links
 Official website
 
 

2021 films
2021 horror films
Films about human trafficking
2020s English-language films